Evan Brophey (born December 3, 1986) is a Canadian former professional ice hockey centre. He played with the Chicago Blackhawks and the Colorado Avalanche of the National Hockey League (NHL).

Playing career
Brophey was drafted 68th overall in the 2005 NHL Entry Draft by the Chicago Blackhawks. Prior to being drafted Brophey played in the Ontario Hockey League, drafted by the Barrie Colts in 37th overall in the priority selection of 2002. Evan also played for the Belleville Bulls and the Plymouth Whalers. He was also remembered for scoring the overtime game-winning goal against Saginaw to clinch the West Division title in 2005–06.
 
On May 15, 2007, Brophey signed a three-year entry level contract with the Blackhawks. In his first professional campaign, in the 2007–08 season, Brophey finished with four goals and 15 assists in 74 games with Blackhawks AHL affiliate, the Rockford IceHogs. He scored his first professional goal and had three points on October 13 against the Iowa Stars in just his second pro contest.

On October 23, 2010 Brophey played in his first NHL game. He achieved one shot on goal during 10 shifts in the 3-2 home loss against the Columbus Blue Jackets.

On July 8, 2011, Brophey signed a one-year contract as a free agent with the Colorado Avalanche. Assigned to AHL affiliate, the Lake Erie Monsters, to begin the 2011–12 season, Brophey was later recalled to make his Avalanche debut and second career game in a 5-4 defeat to the San Jose Sharks on December 16, 2011. After three games with the Avalanche, Brophey was returned to the Monsters and instantly responded to record a Monsters club record with four assists in a 6-5 victory over the Grand Rapids Griffins on December 28. In the remainder of the season with the Monsters, Brophey scored a career high 18 goals and matched his career best 39 points.

With the NHL lockout affecting his status as a free agent, Brophey joined the Portland Pirates of the AHL on a professional try-out just prior to the start of the 2012–13 season on October 15, 2012. Brophey remained with the Pirates for the duration of the season and as an alternate captain, tallied 23 points in 61 games.

On July 30, 2013, Brophey was signed as a free agent to his first European contract on a one-year deal with EC Red Bull Salzburg of the Austrian Hockey League. He enjoyed a successful 2013–14 season with Salzburg, helping claim the crown of Austrian Champions before falling to HC Bolzano in the EBEL final.

Brophey then joined EHC München on a one-year contract on June 5, 2014, following head coach Don Jackson from fellow Red Bull sponsored Austrian team, the EC Red Bull Salzburg of the Austrian Hockey League (EBEL).

For the 2015–16 season, Brophey returned to the EBEL in signing a one-year contract with the Graz 99ers.

After three seasons with the 99ers, Brophy left the EBEL as a free agent to sign a one-year contract with Slovakian club, HC Košice, of the Slovak Extraliga on May 17, 2018.

Career statistics

References

External links

1986 births
Living people
Barrie Colts players
Belleville Bulls players
Canadian ice hockey centres
Chicago Blackhawks draft picks
Chicago Blackhawks players
Colorado Avalanche players
Graz 99ers players
Ice hockey people from Ontario
Sportspeople from Kitchener, Ontario
HC Košice players
Lake Erie Monsters players
EHC München players
Plymouth Whalers players
Portland Pirates players
Rockford IceHogs (AHL) players
EC Red Bull Salzburg players
Canadian expatriate ice hockey players in Austria
Canadian expatriate ice hockey players in Slovakia
Canadian expatriate ice hockey players in Germany
Canadian expatriate ice hockey players in the United States
Canadian expatriate ice hockey players in Romania